Melissa "Missy" Fiorentino (born January 19, 1977) is a female boxer from Cranston, Rhode Island, United States. Her global boxing ID is US-00-076087. Her fighting nickname is: "The Fury"

It could be said that Fiorentino is a rising star in women's boxing. Her only defeat to date has been in a world championship bout, and she has been active as a professional since 2001.

She made her professional debut on November 16, 2001, knocking out Vanessa Pine in the first round in front of a hometown crowd. Fiorentino next beat Ragan Pudwill by knockout in round two on April 4, 2002.

Fiorentino won her first four fights by knockout. On October 4, 
2002, she fought Trisha Hill at the Dunkin' Donuts Center, in Providence. Hill became the first fighter to last the scheduled distance with Fiorentino, but Fiorentino beat her by a four-round unanimous decision.

Next was Brenda Drexel, a relatively experienced fighter of 24 previous fights, who also went on to lose by a four-round unanimous decision to Fiorentino, on May 2, 2003. This the bout was held at the Foxwood Casino in Connecticut.

Two knockouts followed, one in three rounds over Liz Drew and the other, a second round victory over previously undefeated Talia Smith.

Next came what, perhaps, has been Fiorentino's most important victory to date: on May 14, 2004, she met the former and future world champion "Downtown Leona Brown" in Providence, with Fiorentino earning a six-round unanimous decision win.

With that win, Fiorentino got a chance to fight for the world title for the first time: In her first fight abroad, she battled Emiko Raika for the WIBA world Featherweight title on September 18 in Kyoto, Japan. Fiorentino lost her first world title fight by a ten-round unanimous decision.

Fiorentino has a record of twelve wins and one loss, with six wins by knockout.

Professional boxing record

References

External links
 

1977 births
American women boxers
Featherweight boxers
Living people
American people of Italian descent
Sportspeople from Cranston, Rhode Island
Boxers from Rhode Island